The Allegheny and Eastern Railroad  was a shortline railroad operating in Pennsylvania, owned by Genesee & Wyoming Inc. It is now operated by the Buffalo and Pittsburgh Railroad.

Originally named the Allegheny Railroad, Genesee & Wyoming Inc. purchased the company in the early 1990s and renamed it the Allegheny and Eastern Railroad.  The ALY's headquarters were located in Warren, Pennsylvania.  Its main customer was International Paper in Erie, Pennsylvania.  The railroad existed through the Conrail split and was merged into the Buffalo and Pittsburgh Railroad, another Genesee & Wyoming Inc. railroad, in 2004. Simultaneously, a new company with the same name was created to purchase the property, which is now operated by the BPRR. (The ALY also acquired the residual common carrier obligation on the lines.) All motive power that remained on ALY property by the time it was merged into BPRR was relettered "BPRR" on the cab below the numbers, and still remain in ALY paint.

Pennsylvania railroads
Genesee & Wyoming
Non-operating common carrier freight railroads in the United States